Kadirkent (Dargwa: Кьадиркент) is a rural locality (a selo) in Sergokalinsky Selsoviet, Sergokalinsky District, Republic of Dagestan, Russia. The population was 868 as of 2010. There are 9 streets.

Geography 
Kadirkent is located 8 km northwest of Sergokala (the district's administrative centre) by road. Gubden and Sergokala are the nearest rural localities.

Nationalities 
Dargins live there.

References 

Rural localities in Sergokalinsky District